St. Thomas College of Engineering and Technology  (STM) is an undergraduate college in Kannur district of Kerala, India. It is a private college affiliated to APJ Abdul Kalam Technological University established by St Thomas Educational Society, Adoor in the year 2014. It is accredited by the All India Council for Technical Education.

The Courses offered at B.Tech level are Mechanical Engineering, Electronics & Communication Engineering, Computer Science & Engineering, and Civil Engineering. The duration of course for B.Tech is four academic years and eight semesters as prescribed in the curriculum. University examinations will be conducted at the end of the each semester.

Overview
The college was established in the interior of Malabar to cater for the needs of engineering education in the northeastern part of the Malabar area, otherwise deprived of higher education in their area. Yet the college is open to all distinguished students from all over Kerala to benefit from advanced and educated engineering education.

This college is part of the IEDC program of the government of Kerala and is also known for its contribution to innovative start-up activities.

Admissions to the college is based on the Common Entrance Examination (CEE) conducted by the Govt. of Kerala every year.

Department

Engineering 

 Mechanical Engineering
 Computer Science & Engineering
 Civil Engineering
 Electronics & Communication Engineering

Non-Engineering Department 

 Applied Science & Humanities

Facilities

Academics

Student Activities

Placement Cell

Transportation
Location  : Sivapuram P.O, Mattannur, Kannur, Kerala – 670702, India

The Kannur international airport is situated only 13 km away from the college.

Notable alumni

Courses

The STM offers B.Tech Degree in Engineering in four subjects:

Civil Engineering
Computer Science & Engineering 
Electronics & Communication Engineering
Mechanical Engineering

References

Engineering colleges in Kannur district
APJ Abdul Kalam Technological University
Universities and colleges in Kannur district